Rheinheimera japonica is a Gram-negative, rod-shaped, aerobic and motile bacterium from the genus of Rheinheimera which has been isolated from seashore sediments from the Sea of Japan in Russia. Rheinheimera japonica has an antimicrobial activity.

References 

Chromatiales
Bacteria described in 2015